The Taipei Century Symphony Orchestra is one of the oldest symphony orchestras in Taiwan.

History
The orchestra was established by prof. Liao Nian-Fu in 1968.

See also
 List of symphony orchestras in Taiwan

References

Taiwanese orchestras
Musical groups established in 1968
1968 establishments in Taiwan